Amir Arsalan Motahari (born March 10, 1993) is an Iranian footballer who currently Persian Gulf Pro League as a striker.

Club career

Early years
He started his career with Steel Azin U19. He also played at Damash Tehran youth levels. Later he joined Moghavemat Tehran U21 and helped them to become champions in 2013–14 U21 Tehran Asia Vision Premier League.

Naft Tehran
He joined Naft Tehran on May 26, 2014 with a three-year contract. He made his debut against Rah Ahan on August 7, 2014 as a substitute for Hossein Ebrahimi. He also scored his first goal for Naft, in 1–1 draw against Gostaresh. On 18 March 2015, Motahari scored in Naft's 2–1 win against Al Shabab which was the club's first group stage victory in the AFC Champions League.

Personal life
He was born on the 10th of March, 1993 in the town of Garmsar, in the Semnan Province.His father's name is Ardalan motahari. He was a lifetime supporter of Esteghlal Fc and even joined them in the beginning of 2020.

Club career statistics

International career

Youth
He was part of the Iran U-22 squad during the 2013 AFC U-22 Championship and made 2 appearances against Japan U-22 and Australia U-22.

He was invited to the Iran U-23 training camp by Nelo Vingada as preparation for the 2014 Asian Games. He was called into Iran's squad for the 2016 AFC U-23 Championship qualification. Motahari was named the best player of the 2015 WAFF U-23 Championship in October 2015 scoring three goals, including one in the final against Syria which Iran won 2–0. On 12 January 2016 Motahari scored Iran's first goal and assisted the second in their 2–0 victory against Syria in the first match of the 2016 AFC U-23 Championship.

Senior

Motahari was invited to the May 2015 Iran training camp by Carlos Queiroz.

Honours

Club 
Naft Tehran
Hazfi Cup: 2016–17

Esteghlal
Iran Pro League: 2021–22
Hazfi Cup runner-up: 2019–20, 2020–21
Iranian Super Cup: 2022

International
Iran U23
WAFF U-23 Championship : 2015

Individual
WAFF U-23 Championship Best Player : 2015
Persian Gulf Pro League Young Footballer of the Year : 2014–15

References

External links
 Amir Arsalan Motahari at IranLeague.ir

1993 births
Living people
Iranian footballers
Naft Tehran F.C. players
Pars Jonoubi Jam players
Tractor S.C. players
Saham SC players
Zob Ahan Esfahan F.C. players
Esteghlal F.C. players
Persian Gulf Pro League players
Oman Professional League players
People from Semnan Province
Iran under-20 international footballers
Association football forwards
Iranian expatriates in Oman